Eric Krüger (born 21 March 1988, in Oschatz) is a German athlete who competes in the sprint with a personal best time of 45.77 seconds over 400 metres.

Krüger won the bronze medal at the 2012 European Athletics Championships in Helsinki at the 4 × 400 metres relay.

External links 

 
 
 
 

1988 births
Living people
People from Oschatz
People from Bezirk Leipzig
German male sprinters
Sportspeople from Saxony
Olympic athletes of Germany
German national athletics champions
Athletes (track and field) at the 2012 Summer Olympics
European Athletics Championships medalists